Alone is the eleventh studio album by American country music artist Vern Gosdin. It was released in 1989 via Columbia Records. The album peaked at number 11 on the Billboard Top Country Albums chart.

Track listing

Personnel
 Vern Gosdin - lead vocals
 Bill Hullett - acoustic guitar
 Roy Huskey Jr. - upright bass
 Jerry Kroon - drums
 Tim Mensy - acoustic guitar
 Ron Oates - keyboards
 Tom Robb - bass guitar
 Billy Sanford - electric guitar
 Mike Severs - electric guitar
 Jim Vest - steel guitar
 Bob Wray - bass guitar

Charts

Weekly charts

Year-end charts

References

1989 albums
Vern Gosdin albums
Columbia Records albums
Albums produced by Bob Montgomery (songwriter)